Aloe descoingsii is a species of Aloe native to southern Madagascar. Regarded as the smallest Aloe species in the world, it generally reaches a maximum of about 3 inches (7.62cm) across. With white spotted leaves, A. descoingsii grows via offsets in clumps and sports tiny orange flowers.

References

External links

descoingsii
Endemic flora of Madagascar
Plants described in 1958